Lioness is an upcoming spy thriller television series created by Taylor Sheridan. It is due to air on Paramount+.

Premise
A Marine is tasked with befriending the daughter of a terrorist the Central Intelligence Agency is after.

Cast
 Zoe Saldaña as Joe
 Laysla De Oliveira as Cruz Manuelos
 Dave Annable as Neil
 LaMonica Garrett as Two Cups
 James Jordan as Tucker
 Austin Hébert as Randy
 Jonah Wharton as Tex
 Hannah Love Lanier as Kate
 Nicole Kidman as Kaitlyn Meade
 Morgan Freeman as Edwin Mullins
 Michael Kelly as Byron Westfield
 Sam Asghari as Kamal 
 Carla Mansour as Malika
 Adam Budron as Sami
 Martin Donovan as Errol Meade

Production
Lioness was announced in September 2020 as part of a Paramount+ programming slate unveiling. In February 2022, Zoe Saldaña was cast to star in the series, and joined as an executive producer alongside Nicole Kidman. Laysla De Oliveira would join the cast the following month. In June, Sheridan took over as showrunner of the series from Thomas Brady following the conclusion of the show's writers' room. Casting continued in September, with the additions of Dave Annable, LaMonica Garrett, James Jordan, Austin Hébert, Jonah Wharton and Hannah Love Lanier. In January 2023, Kidman and Michael Kelly joined the cast alongside Morgan Freeman.

Production for the series was initially set to begin in June 2022. Filming began in Mallorca in January 2023, and is due to film there until February.

References

External links

American spy thriller television series
English-language television shows
Paramount+ original programming
Television series about the Central Intelligence Agency
Television series created by Taylor Sheridan
Television shows filmed in Spain
Upcoming television series